South Carolina Highway 60 (SC 60) is a  primary state highway in the U.S. state of South Carolina. It serves the town of Irmo, connecting nearby Lake Murray and Harbison State Forest.

Route description
SC 60 is a mostly four-lane with median suburban highway that travels  from SC 6 to U.S. Route 176 (US 176), with an interchange with Interstate 26 (I-26)/US 76.

History
SC 60 was established in 1929 as a new primary routing.  The route has remained unchanged since inception, though its eastern endpoint was originally US 76/SC 2; the highway was widened to mostly four lanes with median by 2000.

Junction list

See also

References

External links

 
 SC 60 at Virginia Highways' South Carolina Highways Annex

060
Transportation in Lexington County, South Carolina
Transportation in Richland County, South Carolina